Sir Martyn John Dudley Lewis  (born 7 April 1945) is a Welsh television news presenter and journalist. He was a presenter for BBC News television programmes between 1986 and 1999 and was known for his involvement in the coverage of the death of Diana, Princess of Wales in 1997. He is also active in the charity sector and is the founder and executive chairman of YourBigDay Ltd.

Early life and education
Lewis was born in Swansea, Glamorgan, though was educated at the co-educational Dalriada School in Northern Ireland, and graduated with a BA degree from Trinity College, Dublin. He then joined BBC Northern Ireland in 1967.

Television news

He was a news presenter and reporter on HTV and ITN, before joining the BBC in October 1986 to present BBC News bulletins until a major relaunch of BBC News output in 1999.

Lewis became the first presenter of the One O'Clock News on BBC1 on 27 October 1986 when it was launched as part of the introduction of the channel's daytime schedule, replacing News After Noon. Subsequently, he presented other bulletins including the Six O'Clock News and Nine O'Clock News.

He created a modicum of controversy in 1993 when he claimed that television should feature more "good news". He subsequently stated that he had been "misunderstood" on the matter.

Lewis played a prominent role in the announcement of the death of Diana, Princess of Wales on Sunday 31 August 1997. He was called into the BBC in the early hours of that morning to present short national bulletins during a late night viewing of Borsalino about the car accident in Paris. He returned home afterwards to get some sleep – expecting the Princess to pull through – only to be drafted in again in time for the special 6am bulletin covering Diana's death.

During the marathon coverage which was simulcast on BBC1, BBC World as well as broadcasters around the world which took in the BBC news feed, Lewis was almost brought to tears following Tony Blair's "People's Princess" statement. His uninterrupted presenting stint ended at 1pm when Peter Sissons took over.

On 26 April 1999, a few weeks before the BBC relaunched its news programmes, he presented the Six O'Clock News bulletin with Jennie Bond on the day his co-host Jill Dando was murdered outside her home in West London. He also appeared on ITV News that evening to pay tribute to Dando.

He presented his last bulletin at the start of May 1999 from Edinburgh, reporting on Scottish devolution, signing off with, "And from me, it's goodbye."

Other television
As part of the celebrations for ITN's 50th anniversary, he returned to television news to present a special edition of the ITV Evening News with Mary Nightingale in September 2005.

Lewis was the long-running host, from 1993, of the BBC news-based quiz show Today's the Day and the primetime BBC TV series Crimebeat from 1996 to 1998.

He retired from newsreading in 1999 and since then has presented occasional programmes on ITV, including Dateline Jerusalem and Ultimate Questions.

He played himself in brief cameo roles in several films, appearing as a newsreader in the 1999 James Bond film The World Is Not Enough, in The Bill and The Vicar of Dibley in 2000, and in archive footage featured in the 2006 film The Queen, as well as Argo, Senna and The James Bond Story.

In 2008, he appeared in the video on board the Heathrow Express as a guide to the airport security.

In 2013, he appeared as the presenter in television commercials for Calgon, acting out interviews with "experts" in a series entitled "Smart Washing with Calgon".

Other business
Lewis was chairman and co-founder of Teliris, one of the first telepresence systems developed. He was actively involved in the marketing of this solution through personal contacts, speaking engagements and "Telepresence Times", his vlog launched in 2009. He retired as chairman in 2012.

He is the founder and Executive Chairman of YourBigDay Ltd, which uses the ITN and Reuters archives to produce birthday and anniversary videos covering most of the last century.

In July 2020, Lewis joined the board of renewable energy start-up Alpha 311.

Charity work
Lewis is a vice-president of Hospice UK, Marie Curie Cancer Care, Macmillan Cancer Support, East Anglia Children's Hospices (EACH) and Demelza Children's Hospice.

He is president of United Response, a charity supporting people with learning disabilities or mental health needs to live in the community, in England and in Wales.

He founded the youth charity YouthNet in 1995 (now known as The Mix), and stayed as chairman until stepping down in July 2014, though he remains an advisor. The charity provides advice, information and support through websites aimed at young people.

From 2010 to 2016 he was chair of the National Council for Voluntary Organisations, an umbrella body for charities in England and Wales with over 13,000 members. He is also chairman of the Queen's Award for Voluntary Service. He was chairman of Families of the Fallen 2010–15; trustee of the Windsor Leadership Trust 2001–10, and is currently deputy chair of the Lord Mayor of London's Dragon Awards.

He is a patron of Mildmay Mission Hospital, The Patchwork Foundation, the quarterly broadsheet Positive News, and Dementia UK.

In September 2015, it was announced that Lewis had become the first ambassador of Pennies, a fintech charity that enables charitable micro-donations.

Personal life
He married Liz Carse in 1970. They met while working at HTV Wales in the late 1960s – she was a continuity announcer and he was a reporter and presenter. Carse died in 2012 after a long battle with Huntington's Disease. Lewis and Carse have two daughters, Kate Lewis  and singer-songwriter Sylvie Lewis.

Lewis is now married to Patsy Baker (née Wallis) who is Senior Group Adviser to the Huntsworth Group of public relations companies.

Honours
Lewis was appointed Commander of the Order of the British Empire (CBE) in 1997 for his services to young people and the hospice movement and was knighted in the 2016 New Year Honours for voluntary and charitable work, especially for the hospice movement.

Lewis also holds an honorary Doctorate of Letters from the University of Ulster, and is a Freeman of the City of London, a fellow of the Royal Society of Arts, and a member of the Garrick Club and the British Academy of Film and Television Arts.

Bibliography
Books by Lewis include:
And Finally (1984) – an anthology of humorous stories that have ended news bulletins over the years. 
Tears and Smiles – the Hospice Handbook (with the Duchess of Kent, 1989) – the first layman's guide to the British Hospice movement. 
Cats in The News (1991) – a humorous anthology which topped the best seller list for 8 weeks. 
Dogs in the News (1992) 
Go For It – Martyn Lewis's Essential Guide to Opportunities for Young People (1993–98) – annual publication which was the forerunner of the charity YouthNet. 
Today's The Day (1995) – based on Lewis' quiz show of the same name. 
Reflections on Success (1997) – interviews with over 60 famous people across a wide range of professions analysing their success. 
Seasons of Our Lives (1999) – an anthology of poetry and prose to comfort, encourage and amuse people as they go through different stages of life.

References

External links

1945 births
BBC newsreaders and journalists
BBC World News
ITN newsreaders and journalists
Living people
People educated at Dalriada School
People from Swansea
Welsh television presenters
Knights Bachelor
Commanders of the Order of the British Empire